Ganegama Liyanage Sarath Gunawardena (May 27, 1949 – May 4, 2003) was a Member of Parliament in Sri Lanka, was born in Galle. He represented the Galle District and was the Ratgama Chief United National Party organizer, and he functioned as a Cabinet consultant to the Sri Lankan government on health and nutrition in 2003.  Gunawardena was also the Managing Director of Hotel Francis, Hikkaduwa.

Sarath Gunawardena died on Saturday May 4, 2003 at the Karapitiya General Hospital at the age of 53.

References

External links
Discussion @ thesundayleader.lk
Results @ Priu.gov.lk
Funeral ' Dailynews.lk

1949 births
2003 deaths
Members of the 10th Parliament of Sri Lanka
Members of the 11th Parliament of Sri Lanka